Shenandoah Farms is an unincorporated community and census-designated place in northeastern Warren County, Virginia, United States. A small portion extends into neighboring Clarke County. The population as of the 2010 United States Census was 3,033. It is a recreational community built on the western slope of Blue Ridge Mountain and the banks of the Shenandoah River.

References

Census-designated places in Warren County, Virginia
Census-designated places in Clarke County, Virginia
Census-designated places in Virginia